The Sobey Art Award is Canada's largest prize for young Canadian artists. It is named after Canadian businessperson and art collector Frank H. Sobey, who established The Sobey Art Foundation. It is an annual prize given to an artist 40 and under who has exhibited in a public or commercial art gallery within 18 months of being nominated. A jury consisting of an international juror and representatives of galleries from the West Coast and the Yukon, the Prairies and the North, Ontario, Quebec and the Atlantic Provinces creates a longlist of 25 artists, five from each region. The jury meets to select the winner and four other finalists, one from each region. 2017 was the first year to see the shortlist dominated by women and also the first year that more than one Indigenous artist was shortlisted.

Up to 2013, a total of $70,000 in prize money was awarded each time the prize was presented; $50,000 to the winner and $5,000 to the other four finalists. In 2014 the total was increased to $100,000 with $50,000 to the winner and $12,500 to the other four finalists. In 2017, the money awarded to longlisted artists was increased from $500 to $1,000. In 2018, the prize money increased once again, to a total of $240,000; $100,000 to the winner, $25,000 for each of the other four finalists, and $2,000 for each short-listed artist.

The award was presented biennially until 2006 at which point it became an annual award. From its inception until 2015, the Art Gallery of Nova Scotia organized and administered the Sobey Art Award and its accompanying exhibition.  The National Gallery of Canada assumed responsibility for the award in 2016. In 2020, Sobey Art Foundation and the National Gallery of Canada decided to distribute the cash award among the 25 finalists rather than just one winner. This was a response to the financial hardships suffered by artists because of the COVID-19 pandemic.

Winners

References

External links 

Canadian art awards
Awards established in 2002
2002 establishments in Canada